is a Japanese manga series written and illustrated by Kōsuke Fujishima. It has been serialized in Kodansha's Monthly Afternoon since May 2016, with its chapters collected in ten tankōbon volumes as of May 2022. In North America, the manga is licensed for English release by Kodansha USA.

Plot
The story follows 18 year-old Toppū Uno, who is aiming at becoming the youngest champion of the world's most prestigious motorcycle race, the MotoGP.

Publication
Toppu GP is written and illustrated by Kōsuke Fujishima. The series began in Kodansha's Monthly Afternoon on May 25, 2016. Kodansha has collected its chapters into individual tankōbon volumes. The first volume was released on November 22, 2016. As of May 23, 2022, ten volumes have been released.

In North America, Kodansha USA is simultaneously publishing the series in English on Kindle and Comixology. It is also digitally published by Crunchyroll Manga since March 2018. Kodansha USA also publishes the series in print and the first volume was released on April 11, 2017.

Volume list

References

External links
 

Kodansha manga
Motorsports in anime and manga
Seinen manga